The Rack is a 1915 American silent drama film directed by Emile Chautard and starring Alice Brady, Milton Sills and June Elvidge.

Plot summary

Cast
 Alice Brady as Mrs. Gordon 
 Milton Sills as Tom Gordon 
 June Elvidge as Louise Freeman 
 Chester Barnett as Jack Freeman 
 Doris Kenyon as Effie McKenzie 
 George Cowl as Mr. McKenzie

References

Bibliography
 Slide, Anthony. Silent Players: A Biographical and Autobiographical Study of 100 Silent Film Actors and Actresses. University Press of Kentucky, 2010.

External links
 
 
 

1915 films
1915 drama films
1910s English-language films
American silent feature films
Silent American drama films
Films directed by Emile Chautard
American black-and-white films
World Film Company films
Films shot in Fort Lee, New Jersey
1910s American films